Øgaard is a surname. Notable people with the surname include:

Leif Øgaard (born 1952), Norwegian chess player
Philip Øgaard (born 1948), Norwegian cinematographer
Suzanne Øgaard (1918–2003), French-born Norwegian painter

Norwegian-language surnames